The Washington Mr. Basketball honor recognizes the top high school basketball player in the state of Washington. The award is presented annually by the Washington Interscholastic Basketball Coaches Association.

Award winners

Winners by school

References

Mr. and Miss Basketball awards
High school sports in Washington (state)
Awards established in 1994
1994 establishments in Washington (state)
Lists of people from Washington (state)
Mr. Basketball